Antrim, sometimes known as Antrim Borough to distinguish it from the former constituency of the same name, was a single-member county constituency of the Parliament of Northern Ireland.

Boundaries and boundary changes

Antrim was a division of County Antrim. Before 1929 it was part of the seven-member Antrim constituency, with which it shared a name. The constituency sent one MP to the House of Commons of Northern Ireland from 1929 until the Parliament was temporarily suspended in 1972, and then formally abolished in 1973.

The division, from 1929 until 1969, adjoined Antrim Mid to the north, Antrim Bannside and Lough Neagh to the west, Antrim South to the south, Belfast to the south-east, Antrim Carrick to the east and Antrim Larne to the north-east.

In terms of the then local government areas the constituency in 1929 comprised parts of the rural districts of Antrim, Ballymena, Belfast and Lisburn.

After boundary changes in 1969, the constituency included parts of the rural districts of Antrim and Lisburn.

From 1969 to 1973, the division bordered Bannside to the north-west, Larne to the north-east, Carrick and Newtownabbey to the east, Belfast and Larkfield to the south-east, South Antrim to the south and Lough Neagh to the west.

Politics
Antrim was only represented by two MPs, both members of the Ulster Unionist Party.  They typically held a large majority and many elections were uncontested.

Members of Parliament

Election results

 Death of Minford

 Boundary changes

 Parliament prorogued 30 March 1972 and abolished 18 July 1973

References
 Northern Ireland Parliamentary Election Results 1921-1972, compiled and edited by Sydney Elliott (Political Reference Publications 1973)

External links
 For the exact definition of Northern Ireland constituency boundaries see http://www.election.demon.co.uk/stormont/boundaries.html

Northern Ireland Parliament constituencies established in 1929
Constituencies of the Northern Ireland Parliament
Historic constituencies in County Antrim
Antrim, County Antrim
Northern Ireland Parliament constituencies disestablished in 1973